The University of Detroit Jesuit High School and Academy was founded in 1877, and is one of two Jesuit high schools in the city of Detroit, Michigan, the other being Loyola High School. Located in the Roman Catholic Archdiocese of Detroit, the school is rooted in the Ignatian tradition. It is an all-boys school with an academy for grades seven and eight. The school's mascot is a tiger cub and its teams are dubbed the Cubs. Its colors are maroon and white.

History
In the winter of 1876-1877, Thomas O'Neill, Jesuit provincial superior in St. Louis, sent John Baptiste Miege to found the school and serve as its first president. Caspar Henry Borgess, who had come to Detroit from Cincinnati on May 8, 1870, was cofounder of the school.

Originally located at the Trowbridge Mansion on Jefferson Avenue, in 1890 the school moved across the street to Dowling Hall to accommodate a growing student body. In 1923 news began circulating that the school would move to what was then the city's edge. Then in the late 1920s construction of the new building began at 8400 S. Cambridge near Seven Mile Road, under John P. McNichols, president of the University of Detroit. This new building was designed by Malcomson and Higginbotham.  Classes at the new campus were scheduled for September 9, 1931, but a polio epidemic kept schools in the Detroit area closed until September 23.

In 1950 U of D Jesuit acquired a new gym. In 1992 under president Malcolm Carron a science center was built, with labs and departmental office space.

In 2001 the school completed its $25 million fund-raising campaign under Timothy Shannon. Funds raised paid for restoration of the original chapel (which had become a library in 1968 after Vatican II) and the addition of several classrooms, an art room, and two new gymnasiums. The faculty endowment, student financial aid, and scholarships also benefited from the campaign.

In 2005, after the closing of several Metro Detroit Catholic schools, University of Detroit Jesuit waived its transfer rules for juniors coming from the closed schools and accepted students with 3.0 or higher grade point averages.

On April 6, 2006, U of D Jesuit began the public phase of a $22 million endowment campaign designed to support tuition assistance, faculty salaries, and other means of strengthening the school's finances.

In 2017 the school proposed to buy a shuttered recreational facility and school that the city had placed up for sale. The president of U of D Jesuit tried to reassure neighbors that some sports facilities would be available to the public in the renovated complex.

Athletics

The Cubs are a member of the Michigan High School Athletic Association (MHSAA) and compete in the Detroit Catholic High School League.

U of D Jesuit fields teams in fourteen sports: football, basketball, baseball, cross country, track and field, wrestling, tennis, golf, hockey, lacrosse, skiing, soccer, swimming, and bowling.

In its history, U of D Jesuit has won six state championships:

The track and field team won the MHSAA Division 1 state championship in 2022.
The basketball team won the MHSAA Class A state championship in 2016.
The bowling team won the MHSAA Division 1 State championship in 2014.
The soccer team won the MHSAA Class A state championship in 2001.
The track team won the MHSAA Class A state championship in 1993.
The golf team won the MHSAA Open Class state championship in 1927, the school's first state title.

Extracurricular activities
The St. Joseph of Arimathea Club was founded in 2015, placing students as pallbearers for those in need.

Notable alumni

Connor Barwin: NFL defensive end
Peter Bauer: computer specialist
Otis Brawley: Chief Medical and Scientific Officer, American Cancer Society
Michael Cavanagh: Michigan Supreme Court Justice
Guy Consolmagno: Vatican astronomer
Ian Conyers: Michigan State Senator
Mark Crilley: Manga creator
James Curran: dean at the School of Public Health, Emory University
Rob Edwards: NBA player
Robert J. Elder, Jr. USAF: Command pilot and Air Force Commander
Keith Ellison: Minnesota Attorney General
Andy Farkas: NFL running back
Daniel Fields: professional baseball 
Robert Fisher:  bishop for the Archdiocese of Detroit
David Grewe: Michigan State head baseball coach
Pat Heenan: NFL cornerback
Stephen Henderson: journalist, Pulitzer Prize winner
Tupac Hunter: state senator - Michigan
Bert Johnson: state senator - Michigan
Gus Johnson: sportscaster
Lawrence Joseph: poet
Thomas Kavanagh: Michigan Supreme Court Chief Justice
Bob King: President, United Auto Workers
William Kovacic: member of the Federal Trade Commission
Frank Lauterbur: football coach, University of Toledo and University of Iowa
Elmore Leonard: novelist
Bruce Maher: NFL safety
John McCabe: author
 Greg Russell TV movie critic NBC
Bill McConico: Judge of the 36th District Court in Michigan
Jordan Morgan: professional basketball player
Michael Moriarty: actor
Jamie Morin: Department of Defense official
Manuel Moroun: transportation magnate
George D. O'Brien: U.S. Congressman
Bill O'Brien: NFL player, and coach for Southern Illinois
James G. O'Hara: congressman from Detroit
Michael Parks: Pulitzer Prize winner
L. Brooks Patterson: Oakland County, Michigan executive
Scott Perry: NBA General Manager
Jim Pietrzak: NFL offensive lineman
Geoff Pope: NFL cornerback 
Louis C. Rabaut: U.S. Congressman
Ron Rice: NFL safety 
Sam Richardson: actor
Jay Sebring (Thomas Kummer): hair stylist, murdered by Manson Family in 1969
Richard Tarnas: author
Mario Trafeli: speed skater
George Winn: NFL running back
Cassius Winston: NBA basketball player for the Washington Wizards , former basketball player for the Michigan State Spartans, 2019 Big Ten Player Conference Men's Basketball Player of the Year
Tillie Voss: NFL tackle

See also
 List of Jesuit sites

References

External links

University of Detroit Jesuit High School Website

Roman Catholic Archdiocese of Detroit
Boys' schools in Michigan
High schools in Detroit
Educational institutions established in 1877
Jesuit high schools in the United States
Catholic secondary schools in Michigan
1877 establishments in Michigan